The Nitzana Border Crossing is an international border crossing between El Ouga and Nitzana, Israel. Opened in 1982, the crossing used to handle pedestrians as well as private cars but most of the crossing was being done via the Taba Border Crossing in Eilat and the Rafah Border Crossing in Rafah that the Israelis decided to shut down the crossing to tourists. There is talk of possibly reopening the crossing to tourists now that the Rafah crossing is no longer in Israeli control.

Today the terminal handles only commercial trade between the two nations. The terminal is open from Sunday to Thursday, 8:00 to 17:00. It is closed from Friday to Saturday as well as Jewish and Islamic holidays.

In February 2013, the crossing was named after Aryeh Eliav, who among other things founded the nearby Nitzana Youth Village.

Egyptian terminal
The Egyptian terminal is accessible via the Ismaïlia-Abu Ujaylah highway in Shamal Sina' (North Sinai).

Israeli terminal

Transportation to and from the terminal
The Israeli border terminal can be reached via the Route 211 which ends at Nitzana Border Crossing, also Highway 10 passes through the crossing. The border terminal can also be reached by Metropoline bus number 44 from Beersheba's central bus station.

References

External links
Official
 Nitzana Border Terminal info

Egypt–Israel border crossings
Toll bridges